Alfredo Travia (February 22, 1924 - October 17, 2000) was an Italian professional football player.

1924 births
2000 deaths
Italian footballers
Serie A players
Taranto F.C. 1927 players
Como 1907 players
Aurora Pro Patria 1919 players
Juventus F.C. players
U.S. Alessandria Calcio 1912 players
Association football defenders